Neil Wallace (born 1939) is an American economist and professor of economics at Penn State University. He is considered one of the main proponents of new classical macroeconomics in the field of economics.

Education
Wallace earned his BA in economics from Columbia University in 1960 and his Ph.D in economics from the University of Chicago in 1964, where he studied under Nobel Prize-winning economist Milton Friedman.

Career
In 1969, Wallace was hired as a consultant to the Federal Reserve Bank of Minneapolis. He served as a professor at the University of Minnesota from 1974 until 1994 and as a professor at the University of Miami from 1994 until 1997. In 1997, he was hired as a professor at Penn State.

In 1975, he and Thomas J. Sargent proposed the policy-ineffectiveness proposition, which refuted a basic assumption of Keynesian economics. In 2012, he was elected Distinguished Fellow of the American Economic Association.

Selected publications
 Ricardo De O. Cavalcanti and Neil Wallace, 1999. "Inside and Outside Money as Alternative Media of Exchange," Journal of Money, Credit and Banking, 31(3, Part 2), pp. 443–457.
 Thomas J. Sargent and Neil Wallace, "Rational Expectations and the Dynamics of Hyperinflation," International Economic Review, 14(2),  (Jun., 1973), pp. 328–350.
 _ and _, 1973.  The Stability of Models of Money and Growth with Perfect Foresight," Econometrica, 41(6), pp. 1043–1048.
 
 
 _ and _, 1981. "Some Unpleasant Monetarist Arithmetic," Federal Reserve Bank of Minneapolis  Quarterly Review, 5(3), pp. 1–17.
 Neil Wallace, 1980. The Overlapping Generations Model of Fiat Money," in Models of Monetary Economies, Federal Reserve Bank of Minneapolis, pp. 49–82. Abstract.
 _, 2001.  "Whither Monetary Economics?," International Economic Review, 42(4), pp. p. 847–869.

Notes

External links
Neil Wallace biography at Penn State Department of Economics
Neil Wallace at Google Scholar

1939 births
Living people
20th-century American economists
21st-century American economists
Monetary economists
New classical economists
Columbia College (New York) alumni
University of Chicago alumni
University of Minnesota faculty
University of Miami faculty
Pennsylvania State University faculty
Fellows of the Econometric Society
Fellows of the American Academy of Arts and Sciences
Distinguished Fellows of the American Economic Association